Eugène Henry (22 December 1862 – 27 December 1930) was a Belgian civil servant and governor-general of Belgian Congo from 5 January 1916 until 30 January 1921.

He is buried in the Brussels Cemetery in Evere.

References
HENRY (Eugène Joseph Marie) in Biographie Coloniale Belge (Inst. roy. colon. belge; T. IV, 1955, col. 390–394) 
 Gouverneurs du Congo
 Archive Eugène Henry, Royal museum for central Africa

1862 births
1930 deaths
Belgian civil servants
Governors-General of the Belgian Congo
People from Soignies
Walloon people
Belgian people of World War I